Phil McDermott is a British actor. Before turning to acting he was a trainee priest, a scrap metal worker, a weighbridge operator and a carpenter. He is most famous for playing a regular character in the BBC soap opera EastEnders. He played the dim-witted odd-job man, Trevor Short from 1989–1990. His character was one of many to be axed from the show in early 1990 following the introduction of the new executive-producer, Michael Ferguson.

Since leaving EastEnders McDermott has appeared in the children's situation comedy Dizzy Heights (BBC; 1991), which was set in a "wacky hotel".

References

External links

British male soap opera actors
Living people
Year of birth missing (living people)